Austria competed at the 1984 Summer Paralympics in Stoke Mandeville, Great Britain and New York City, United States. 47 competitors from Austria won 44 medals including 14 gold, 20 silver and 10 bronze and finished 17th in the medal table.

See also 
 Austria at the Paralympics
 Austria at the 1984 Summer Olympics

References 

Austria at the Paralympics
1984 in Austrian sport
Nations at the 1984 Summer Paralympics